This is a list of results for all the unofficial matches played by the Argentina national football team.

Results

Key

1901–1949

1950–1999

21st Century

Notes

References

Argentina national football team results
Argentina
National team results